Ladislav Salai Jr. (born 18 January 1961) is a Slovak chess composer and chess player.

In 2011 Ladislav Salai Jr. gained the title International Solving Grandmaster, then in 2017 the title International Grandmaster of the FIDE for Chess Compositions.

In the Solvers' rating list of WFCC, April 2013, he is the 11th with 2613 rating points.

References

 Prvý veľmajster, PAT A MAT 78, March 2012

External links
 Jr.' Salai's problems at the PDB Server

1961 births
Living people
Slovak chess players
Chess composers